Jatuncucho (possibly from Quechua hatun big, k'uchu corner) is a mountain in the Vilcanota mountain range in the Andes of Peru, about  high. It is situated in the Cusco Region, Canchis Province, San Pablo District, in the Puno Region, Carabaya Province, Corani District, and in the Melgar Province, Nuñoa District. Jatuncucho lies between Pomanota in the north-west and Jonorana in the east and north-east of the mountain Cochacucho.

References

Mountains of Peru
Mountains of Cusco Region
Mountains of Puno Region